Baron of Aghrim was a title created twice in the Peerage of Ireland, both times as a subsidiary title.  The first creation was on 13 April 1676 for Lord John Butler, who was created Earl of Gowran at the same time.  Both titles became extinct a year later. The second creation was on 4 March 1692 for Godert de Ginkell, who was also created Earl of Athlone.  This creation of the title (along with the Earldom of Athlone), became extinct in 1844.

Barons Aghrim; First creation (1676)
see Earl of Gowran

Barons Aghrim; Second creation (1692)
See Earl of Athlone

References

1676 establishments in Ireland
Extinct baronies in the Peerage of Ireland
Noble titles created in 1676
Noble titles created in 1692